Boillat is a surname. Notable people with the surname include:

Laurent Boillat (1911–1985), Swiss sculptor and engraver
Marcel Boillat (1929–2020), Swiss political activist

See also
 Boillot